On 19 October 1987, a train on the Heart of Wales line derailed and fell into the River Towy due to the partial collapse of the Glanrhyd Bridge near Llandeilo, Carmarthenshire. Four people died as a result of the tragedy; the driver and three of the passengers drowned.

Description
The event took place early on Monday 19 October 1987. The 05:27 passenger train from Swansea to Shrewsbury, consisting of a two-car Class 108 DMU fell into the River Towy near Llandeilo at approximately 07:00. The accident was caused by the Glanrhyd Bridge being partially washed away by the swollen river. The train was moving at only , which was the normal speed limit for this bridge.

Carwyn Davies, a nearby farmer (and amateur rugby player for Llanelli), had waited until 07:00 for daylight so he could investigate the flooding on his farm. He attempted to return to his house to telephone a warning, but had not reached there when he heard the train approaching and saw the first carriage "take off" from the bridge. Davies later helped rescuers to reach the bridge using his tractor.

Of the ten people on board the train, three passengers and three members of British Rail staff managed to escape but the driver and three passengers drowned. Staff on board included a Traffic Manager and an Engineer who were accompanying the train to inspect the route after reports of flooding and track damage had been received the previous day. The train left the tracks and fell into the swollen river at Glanrhyd Bridge, though the rear carriage remained partially on the rails and above water. While the passengers and staff were calmly making their way through to the rear carriage, the front carriage broke away and was swept downstream with the driver and three of the passengers (a married couple and a teenage schoolboy) still inside.

A result of the incident was that the procedures for checking railway bridges were tightened. Over the following 20 years there were no other rail passenger fatalities in Wales.

Sources

References

External links
BBC Report: Glanrhyd disaster: Memories of train tragedy 30 years on
BBC Report: Glanrhyd Rail Disaster

Derailments in Wales
Railway accidents in 1987
1987 disasters in the United Kingdom
1987 in Wales
20th century in Carmarthenshire
History of Carmarthenshire
Bridge disasters in the United Kingdom
Bridge disasters caused by scour damage
Transport in Carmarthenshire
River Towy
Llandeilo
Accidents and incidents involving British Rail
October 1987 events in the United Kingdom